James Kanati Allen (January 25, 1947 – December 31, 2011) was an American gymnast. He competed for the seventh-place U.S. team at the 1968 Summer Olympics. Allen, who was of black and Native American descent, was the first African-American gymnast to compete at the Olympic Games.

References

External links
 

1947 births
2011 deaths
American male artistic gymnasts
African-American male gymnasts
Olympic gymnasts of the United States
Gymnasts at the 1968 Summer Olympics
Gymnasts from Los Angeles
20th-century African-American sportspeople
21st-century African-American people